Burzum is the debut studio album by the Norwegian black metal solo project Burzum. It was released in March 1992, through Euronymous's label Deathlike Silence Productions. Six of the songs were later re-recorded in 2010 and released on the album From the Depths of Darkness, as Varg Vikernes was dissatisfied with some of the original vocals and production.

Most reissues of the album have been released as Burzum/Aske which includes the Aske EP as the final three tracks. Only the Aske version of "A Lost Forgotten Sad Spirit" was included on this edition.

Track listing
All music and lyrics by Varg Vikernes except "Ea, Lord of the Deeps", words taken from the Necronomicon.

Original Pressing

Burzum/Aske

Note: Burzum/Aske renames track 3 as "Spell of Destruction" as Vikernes claims the word "Black" was added to the title by Euronymous without his knowledge. Track 2 is also amended to "Ea, Lord of the Depths".

Personnel
Burzum

Count Grishnackh – vocals, guitar, bass guitar, drums, synthesizer, production

Additional credits
Euronymous – guitar solo on "War", gong on "Dungeons of Darkness", production (Only the original and 2022 pressings list the "Co-Producer" credit.)
Pytten (Eirik Hundvin) – engineering, mastering, production
Jannicke Wiese-Hansen – album artwork (artwork is a partial re-creation of The Temple of Elemental Evil's cover art.)

Notes

References

External links
Burzum on Burzum's official website

1992 debut albums
Burzum albums
Norwegian-language albums

pt:Belus